Go, Vandals, Go is the official fight song of the University of Idaho in Moscow.

The song was composed  in 1930 by John Morris "Morey" O'Donnell (1912–1977), the freshman class vice president from Granite (between Coeur d'Alene and Sandpoint). He graduated from Coeur d'Alene High School, the UI law school, and became a prominent attorney in the state at Moscow. A member of Phi Delta Theta fraternity, O'Donnell was a talented pianist and had played internationally before college.  The title is similar to cross-state rival Idaho State Bengals song Growl, Bengals, Growl.

Previously, the Vandals had used a variation of "On, Wisconsin" as its fight song.

Most fight songs are hard to sing because of the fast beat used to make them sound spirited.  However, O'Donnell wrote the song almost entirely with whole notes and half notes to make it easy for a large football crowd to sing; he also added a heavy drumbeat to carry the spirit.

For many years, it has been cited as one of the top fight songs in the United States.  For example,  2002, Norm Maves, Jr. of The Oregonian in Portland described it as "the once and future king of college fight songs, with a fanfare lead-in that could motivate a successful infantry charge."

Lyrics
Came a tribe from the North, brave and bold,
Bearing banners of Silver and Gold;
Tried and true to subdue all their foes
Go Vandals, go mighty Vandals!

Go, Vandals, go,
Fight on with hearts true and bold,
Foes will fall before your Silver and your Gold.

The victory cannot be withheld from thee,
So all bear down for Idaho,
Come on old Vandals, go!

I-D-A-H-O
Idaho, Idaho, Go! Go! Go!

Source:

Bing Crosby fight song
Singer Bing Crosby, raised in Spokane, recorded an unrelated Idaho fight song in 1947; "You're the Gem State Wonder, Idaho" was set to the melody of "Buckle Down, Winsocki" from the 1943 musical Best Foot Forward (and 1941 Broadway play). A few months later, Crosby was an absentee judge for a campus beauty contest, documented in the UI

References

External links

 YouTube – Go, Vandals, Go (with lyrics)
 Arrangement for flute

American college songs
College fight songs in the United States
Big Sky Conference fight songs
Idaho Vandals
Year of song missing
1930 songs